Pengkalan Kota is a state constituency in Penang, Malaysia, that has been represented in the Penang State Legislative Assembly since 1974. It covers the eastern quayside of George Town's city centre and its historic Seven Streets Precinct.

The state constituency was first contested in 1974 and is mandated to return a single Assemblyman to the Penang State Legislative Assembly under the first-past-the-post voting system. , the State Assemblyman for Pengkalan Kota is Gooi Zi Sen from the Democratic Action Party (DAP), which is part of the state's ruling coalition, Pakatan Harapan (PH).

Definition

Polling districts 
According to the federal gazette issued on 30 March 2018, the Pengkalan Kota constituency is divided into 9 polling districts.

This state seat encompasses the eastern part of George Town's UNESCO World Heritage Site, specifically around much of Weld Quay. Historically, the eastern quayside of the city centre was the original location of the Port of Penang. Towards the end of the 19th century, the Port of Penang's trade boom led to a growth of harbour-related jobs around this particular locality, which also attracted increasing numbers of Chinese and Indian labourers to satiate the demand for manpower.

In addition, the Pengkalan Kota constituency covers the adjacent Chinese Clan Jetties, including the famous Chew Jetty, as well as the Seven Streets Precinct (between Komtar and the eastern shoreline of George Town), the latter of which is outside the UNESCO Site. Both of these residential areas came into being in the late 19th century and contain predominantly working-class Chinese electorates. The newer neighbourhood of Macallum Street Ghaut, which was reclaimed from the sea in the 1970s, also falls under this state seat.

The state constituency is bounded by the following roads: China Street Ghaut to the north, and Beach Street, Prangin Road, Carnavon Street, Magazine Road, Brick Kiln Road and Jalan C.Y. Choy to the west. The lower Pinang River also marks the southern limits of this constituency.

Demographics

History 
Bridge Street, located within the Seven Streets Precinct, was renamed after Chooi Yew Choy, who became the State Assemblyman for Pengkalan Kota between 1974 and 1980. Choy had also served as the last Mayor of George Town between 1964 and 1966, prior to the dissolution of the George Town City Council.

After Choy's death in 1980, a by-election for the Pengkalan Kota constituency was held, in which Lim Kean Siew of the Malaysian Chinese Association (MCA) defeated Lim Ewe Chin, an independent candidate.

Election results 
The electoral results for the Pengkalan Kota state constituency in 2008, 2013 and 2018 are as follows.

See also 
 Constituencies of Penang

References 

Penang state constituencies